The 1928 United States presidential election in Georgia took place on November 6, 1928, as part of the wider United States presidential election. Voters chose 14 representatives, or electors, to the Electoral College, who voted for president and vice president.

Background
With the exception of a handful of historically Unionist North Georgia counties – chiefly Fannin but also to a lesser extent Pickens, Gilmer and Towns – Georgia since the 1880s had been a one-party state dominated by the Democratic Party. Disfranchisement of almost all African-Americans and most poor whites had made the Republican Party virtually nonexistent outside of local governments in those few hill counties, and the national Democratic Party served as the guardian of white supremacy against a Republican Party historically associated with memories of Reconstruction. The only competitive elections were Democratic primaries, which state laws restricted to whites on the grounds of the Democratic Party being legally a private club.

However, with all other prominent Democrats sitting the election out, the party nominated Alfred E. Smith, four-term Governor of New York as its nominee for 1928, with little opposition. Smith had been the favorite for the 1924 nomination, but had lost due to opposition to his Catholic faith and "wet" views on Prohibition: he wished to repeal or modify the Volstead Act.

Once Smith was nominated – despite his attempt to dispel fears by nominating "dry" Southern Democrat Joseph T. Robinson as his running mate – extreme fear ensued in the South, which had no experience of the Southern and Eastern European Catholic immigrants who were Smith's local constituency. Southern fundamentalist Protestants believed that Smith would allow papal and priestly leadership in the United States, which Protestantism was a reaction against.

In Georgia – alongside Texas the only state that had never to that point voted Republican even during Reconstruction – many Protestant ministers were strongly opposed to Smith. However, with the state’s large number of majority-black counties, there was great opposition to Hoover because of the strong Republican association with Reconstruction and black political power.
As of 2020, this is the last election in which a Democratic candidate won Georgia without carrying Fulton County (home to Atlanta).

Vote
The Smith/Robinson ticket carried the state of Georgia on election day, making the state, with Texas voting Republican for the first time, the only state to have never voted for a Republican presidential candidate. Nonetheless, Hoover did fare better than any other GOP presidential nominee in Georgia history, and his vote percentage would not be beaten until Barry Goldwater carried the state in 1964, by when the national Democratic Party had become firmly linked with black civil rights. As in the rest of the South, Hoover’s gains were largely confined to areas with few blacks, where he gained up to fifty percent in Forsyth and Wilkes Counties, and in other northern upcountry counties he gained over forty percent. Nevertheless, unlike most Black Belt areas where there was no pro-Hoover trend, in some heavily black counties like Long, Effingham and McDuffie where the white voting population was substantially German Lutheran and intensely hostile to Catholicism, Hoover did make large gains, meaning that Georgia was one of only two states where any counties with nonvoting black majorities deserted Smith. Hoover also made large gains from the newly developing urban middle class in Atlanta and Augusta, where his gains on Coolidge were comparable to the most anti-Catholic upcountry areas.

Results

Results by congressional districts

Results by county

Notes

References

Georgia
1928
1928 Georgia (U.S. state) elections